Charles Leander "Bumpus" Jones (January 1, 1870 – June 25, 1938) was a right-handed starting pitcher in Major League Baseball who played for the Cincinnati Reds and New York Giants.

Early life
He was born in Cedarville, Ohio. Newspaper accounts from Cedarville have described him as being listed as black, albeit with skin that passed for Caucasian. Census reports listed him as a "mulatto". Genelogical research has speculated that Jones came from "Pocahontas' people in Virginia."

Baseball career
Jones made only eight appearances in his brief major league career, he threw a no-hitter in his first major league appearance with the Cincinnati Reds on October 15, 1892, the last day of the season. The victims that day were the Pittsburgh Pirates, who lost 7–1. Jones was not perfect, as he gave up four walks, and he did not pitch a shutout, as an error led to an unearned run. But it was quite a start, and was his only outing of the season. This is still the latest date in the season that a no-hitter has ever been pitched in major league history.  It was also one of the last games played with a "pitcher's box" with the pitcher beginning 55 1/2 feet from home plate; the following season, the pitcher's mound would be introduced, with pitchers starting their pitch on a rubber slab 60 feet and 6 inches from home plate. 

After that, Jones split 1893 between Cincinnati and the New York Giants, appearing in seven games overall, while going 1–4 with a 10.19 ERA. Jones would never pitch in the majors again. He remains the only player in Major League history to pitch a no-hitter in his first game. Only Bobo Holloman of the St. Louis Browns, Ted Breitenstein of the St. Louis Browns, and Tyler Gilbert of the Arizona Diamondbacks have managed to join Jones as pitchers to throw no-hitters in their first major league start, but they had previously appeared in a relief role. According to sabermetrician Bill James, Jones edges out Holloman for the distinction of mathematically least likely pitcher ever to have thrown a no-hitter in the major leagues.

In a two-season major league career, Jones posted a 2–4 career record with 10 strikeouts and a 7.99 ERA in  innings of labor. After leaving the major leagues, Jones continued to pitch professionally. Jones pitched for the Grand Rapids Rippers and Sioux City Cornhuskers in 1894. He pitched for the Columbus Senators from 1896 to 1899, and until recently was credited with the team record for career games pitched, with 212. Modern research, however, indicates that the actual total may be closer to 150. Jones finished his minor league career with the St. Paul Saints in 1901.

Death
Jones died in Xenia, Ohio, at age 68 from complications of a stroke, and he was laid to rest at North Cemetery in Cedarville, Ohio.

See also
 List of Major League Baseball no-hitters

References

External links

Baseball Almanac
The Baseball Guru
Bill James' Expected No-Hitters Formula and Trivia

1870 births
1938 deaths
People from Cedarville, Ohio
Cincinnati Reds players
New York Giants (NL) players
Major League Baseball pitchers
Baseball players from Ohio
19th-century baseball players
Aurora (minor league baseball) players
Monmouth (minor league baseball) players
Aurora Maroons players
Quincy Ravens players
Portland Gladiators players
Ottumwa Coal Palaces players
Joliet Convicts players
Aurora Indians players
Atlanta Firecrackers players
Providence Clamdiggers (baseball) players
Sioux City Cornhuskers players
Grand Rapids Rippers players
Grand Rapids Gold Bugs players
Columbus Buckeyes (minor league) players
Columbus Senators players
Grand Rapids Furnituremakers players
Cleveland Lake Shores players
Fort Wayne Indians players
Wheeling Stogies players
St. Paul Saints (Western League) players